The 2008 PartyPoker.com Grand Slam of Darts was the second staging of the darts tournament, the Grand Slam of Darts organised by the Professional Darts Corporation. The event took place from 15 to 23 November 2008 at the Wolverhampton Civic Hall, Wolverhampton, England. As with 2007, the tournament included players from both the PDC and BDO organisations.

Phil Taylor successfully defended the title after defeating Terry Jenkins 18–9 in the final.

James Wade also hit the first nine-dart finish in the history of this tournament, during his second round defeat by Gary Anderson.

Prize Fund 
The prize fund for the 2008 tournament was as follows:

Qualifying
There were 15 tournaments that provided qualifying opportunities to players. Most tournaments offered a qualifying position for the winner and runner-up of the tournament, however the World Championships and the 2007 Grand Slam also offered a place in the tournament to the losing semi-finalists. There were also various other ways of qualifying for overseas players, including those from Australia and the United States, as well as a wildcard qualifying event open to any darts player.

Qualifying tournaments

PDC

BDO
For the second year running, Martin Adams declined his invitation to take part in the competition.

Defunct Tournaments

Other qualifiers

Pro-Celebrity Challenge
As a curtain-raiser for the main Grand Slam of Darts, a competition involving eight celebrities and eight of the professionals taking part in the Grand Slam took place on the Friday before the tournament. The winners of the tournament collected a first prize of £8,000. In a closely fought final, James Wade and Steve Backley won a final-leg decider over Phil Taylor and Neil Ruddock, with Backley's double two checkout sealing the victory. Those involved were:

Draw and results 
all matches first-to-3/best of 5.

Draw

Group stages
All matches first-to-5/best of 9.

NB in Brackets: Number = Seeds; BDO = BDO Darts player; Q = Qualifier
NB: P = Played; W = Won; L = Lost; LF = Legs for; LA = Legs against; +/- = Plus/minus record, in relation to legs; Average = 3-dart average; Pts = Points.

Group A

15 November

16 November

17 November

Group B

15 November

16 November

17 November

Nine-dart shootout
With Andy Hamilton and Alan Tabern finishing level on points and leg difference, a piece of history was made, with a nine-dart shootout between the two to see who would play Phil Taylor in the second round. The match took place after the conclusion of Tuesday's second round matches.

Group C

15 November

16 November

17 November

Group D

15 November

16 November

17 November

Group E

15 November

16 November

18 November

Group F

15 November

16 November

18 November

Group G

15 November

16 November

18 November

Group H 

15 November

16 November

18 November

Knockout stages

Statistics

Television coverage 
ITV Sport again broadcast coverage throughout the championship, in the UK. Again, Matt Smith presented the coverage on ITV4, with analysis from Chris Mason and Alan Warriner-Little, commentary from Peter Drury, Stuart Pyke and John Rawling and reports from Ned Boulting and Janie Omorogbe.

Match fixing allegations
Five days after the tournament concluded, the PDC revealed that the organisation had received complaints concerning the Group H match between Darryl Fitton and Gary Anderson, and forwarded those complaints to the Darts Regulation Authority. On 26 January 2009 it was announced that there was no evidence of player collusion in the arranging of match outcomes.

External links and references 

Grand Slam of Darts
Grand Slam of Darts
Grand Slam of Darts
Grand Slam of Darts